Patrick Treacy is a Visiting Professor of Dermatology, Honorary Fellow in Cosmetic Surgery and general practitioner with special interests in dermatology and aesthetic medicine, who is based in Dublin, Ireland. He is recognised as one of the first pioneers of the field of Aesthetic Medicine.
He is Visiting Professor of Medicine at  Isra University, Pakistan, and received an Honorary Fellowship in Cosmetic Surgery (2022) from the Australian College of Cosmetic Surgery and Medicine. Treacy founded the Ailesbury Clinic and practices in Dublin and Cork, and is Irish Regional Representative to the British Association of Cosmetic Doctors. He was the lead cosmetic doctor for Michael Jackson's dermatology and aesthetic treatments during the period he lived in Ireland, and was listed as the 'Top Aesthetic Practitioner in the World (Las Vegas) 2019' as well as 'Top Aesthetic Medical Aesthetic Practitioner (UK) 2019', earning himself a spot in the Aesthetic Medicine Hall of Fame. He was also given a special MyFaceMyBody Award recognition in 2018 for his scientific contribution to Aesthetic Medicine and cited amongst their 'Ultimate 100 Global Aesthetic Leaders' both in 2019, 2018 and 2017. He is recognised to be among the first doctors worldwide to use hyaluronidase  during vascular filler occlusion and to establish protocols for its use. He was also shortlisted for an 2022 Irish HealthCare Award for advocating the use of Methotrexate in the resolution of non-responsive post COVID-19 vaccine dermal filler nodules. Treacy has also been a contributor to television and radio shows such as RTÉ Television, BBC and Dr. Drew on CNN. In March 2022, he gave an inspirational Ted Talk about changing obstructions into opportunity at Cork University, Ireland in a lecture entitled 'Never Give Up on Your Dreams'.
In June 2022, the Irish Daily Mirror said Dr Treacy is set to shake up reality TV appearing on two Virgin Media shows in the coming weeks. These were 'Lucy's Tribes' and 'Eating with the Enemy'].. A portrait photograph of Dr. Treacy was featured in an exhibit of 50 ‘Paddy Portraits’ which opened in New York City ahead of St. Patrick’s Day. The aim was to showcase the diversity of the contemporary Irish male, and to challenge the global stereotype of the ‘Irish Paddy’ through a stunning collection of portrait photographs.

Early life and education
Treacy was born in Garrison, Fermanagh, Northern Ireland where his parents ran a shop, garage, and filing station. In 1978, he completed an honours degree in biochemistry at Queens University in Belfast during the height of The Troubles. Due to the conflict in Northern Ireland, he transferred to the Royal College of Surgeons in Ireland in Dublin to study medicine. He states that he took a break during his education and travelled for a period with David Bowie's Serious Moonlight in Europe. In 1986, Treacy graduated and became a practicing doctor in Dublin. In 1987, he was accidentally jabbed in the leg with a needle used on an HIV patient while working in a Dublin hospital. This resulted in him having to cut out an area of his leg as this was before protease inhibitor treatments for AIDS existed and he never developed the illness. In his first memoir, Behind the Mask: The Extraordinary Story of the Irishman who became Michael Jackson's Doctor he states that this incident led to being involved in humanitarian work in Africa and later to pioneer new aesthetic treatment surgeries to help people with AIDS and HIV. In his later novel ‘The Needle and The Damage Done’, he explains how this terrifying moment could have cost him his life. After that incident he moved to New Zealand in 1988 to work as a respiratory and cardiology registrar with Dunedin Hospital. In 1990, he became a staff health doctor at Ibn 'al Bitar Hospital in Baghdad during Saddam Hussein's reign and that he was arrested near Erbil by the Iraqi Army while traveling through Kurdistan, and jailed for five days while sourcing material for an article for the Fermanagh Herald about the gassing of the Kurds in Halabja. He was ship's surgeon with Carnival Cruise Line in California from 1993 through 1994, and later in Florida. In the late 1990s, Treacy worked as a flying doctor in Broken Hill N.S.W. with Royal Flying Doctor Service of Australia and later treated skin cancers in Toowoomba Australia .

Career and bibliography
In 2000, he founded the Ailesbury Clinic in Dublin and another Ailesbury Clinic in Cork in 2005. The clinics were very successful and expanded internationally. In 2003, Treacy won the "Professional Media Journalist of the Year" category at the GlaxoSmithKline Medical Media Awards for articles concerning the impact of HIV on the African continent that he had written in Irish Medical Times. In his memoir, Behind the Mask he details how the Irish recession affected his international business, and that of many of his patients. In April 2016, at the height of the Irish recession, the High Court in Dublin granted a possession order over some clinic buildings, and Treacy made a €137,897 settlement with the Irish Revenue as a result of unpaid taxes, interest and penalties. In December 2019, he pleaded guilty to charges of engaging in threatening, abusive or insulting behaviour and being drunk and a source of danger to himself or others at an Irish hotel. In April 2021 he released a book called The Needle and the Damage Done, an autobiographical memoir covering the period 2012–2021. De Mode Magazine included it as No3 in 'Unputdownable books for 2023 -a list of page turners'.  
The book also gives background on innovations that contributed to his being lauded as Top Aesthetic Practitioner in the World (USA) in 2019, and Top Aesthetic Medical Aesthetic Practitioner in the UK in 2019. It also describes Treacy's research on the influence of botulinum toxin on the brain, including chronic migraines, and how he developed new protocols to reverse the damage being done to patient's faces because of complications with dermal fillers. In 2021, Dr Treacy founded the International Medical Aesthetics Complications Conference (IMACC), which will take place at both the Royal College of Surgeons in Ireland, and University College Dublin (UCD), on 14–16 July 2022. In April 2022 he released a book called The Evolution of Aesthetic Medicine, an autobiographical memoir covering 2012–2021.In the book, Dr Treacy provides a historical narrative of how botulinum toxin, dermal fillers and laser technologies made their way into the field of aesthetic medicine, detailing the evolution of these procedures. In July 2022, he authored a book called Prevention and Management of Aesthetic Complications , which featured contributions from more than twenty world-leading experts in Aesthetic Medicine concerning the management and prevention of aesthetic complications in dermal fillers, botulinum, chemical peels and lasers.   
In January 2023 he released another book about his personal experiences, entitled Aesthetic Complications and Other Interesting Cases. According to publisher Austin Macauley, the book contains many aesthetic complication cases encountered by Dr Treacy since he first established a hyaluronidase protocol for dermal fillers in 2005.

Affiliation with Michael Jackson
Michael Jackson sought him for cosmetic treatment after reading about his experience with HLA fillers and his charitable work working with HIV patients in Africa. He was Jackson's personal dermatologist and developed a friendship with the singer. Treacy and Jackson worked on humanitarian projects together. In 2011, Treacy became an ambassador for the Michael Jackson Legacy foundation, and in 2012 opened Everland Children's Orphanage in Liberia and orphanages in Haiti in 2013. In 2009, Treacy was on the special witness list for the trial of Conrad Murray, however, he was not called to testify. He released a memoir entitled Behind the Mask: The Extraordinary Story of the Irishman who became Michael Jackson's Doctor in 2015. In The Sunday Times in 2021, Treacy recalled an incident in which he mistook Nelson Mandela for a South Africa concert promoter arranging a humanitarian concert in Cape Town after Michael Jackson handed the phone during a vitiligo treatment.

Humanitarian work
The 1987 needlestick incident eventually led to Treacy's humanitarian work in Africa and his developing an empathy to people who suffered from HIV/AIDS and were marginalised or discriminated against as a consequence. Treacy pioneered new aesthetic and surgical treatments to help people with LD-HIV, a condition characterized by loss of subcutaneous fat associated with infection with HIV. In 1993, he visited HIV orphanages in Zimbabwe and South Africa, and some of his later medical articles about these experiences won him Irish professional media awards. In 2001, Treacy challenged 'traditional' views on treating AIDS at a medical conference in South Africa, where he had done a placement as a young doctor. Treacy openly challenged Thabo Mbeki for his stance on AIDS when he advocated that the correlation between poverty and the AIDS rate in Africa was a challenge to the viral theory of AIDS. In 2002, he wrote an article for the Irish Medical Times entitled "A Tragedy That Has Resulted in Countless Needless Deaths in Africa". Mbeki's ban of antiretroviral drugs in public hospitals is estimated to be responsible for the premature deaths of between 330,000 and 365,000 people. In 2011, Treacy became an ambassador for the Michael Jackson Legacy foundation (a charitable organisation dedicated to continuing Jackson's humanitarian legacy), which helped HIV children and built orphanages for abandoned orphans. In 2012, he opened the Everland Children's Orphanage in Monrovia Liberia, which was funded by Jackson's fans through MJL. In 2013, he opened a second Everland Children's orphanage high in the mountains and fifty miles away from the earthquake epicentre in Mireblais, Haiti. This was on the same site where Digicel also built a new school to replace the devastated Miracle Restoration Centre in Tabare.

Accolades
He was awarded best non-surgical treatment at the inaugural "My Face My Body Awards" in London in 2012. Treacy received an AMEC Aesthetic Award for novel techniques in facial rejuvenation in Paris in 2014 and the 20th World Congress in Aesthetic medicine Lecture Award in Miami in 2015. In 2016 he was Highly Commended in the 'Doctor of the Year' Award at the Safety in Beauty Awards in London. Treacy also won lecturing awards regarding reversal of dermal necrosis post filler vascular occlusion in Tbilisi, Georgia and Cairo, Egypt in this period He was also awarded a special medal for contributions to the field of Aesthetic Medicine at CCME in Cuernavaca, Mexico 2016 as well as being presented with an award for medical excellence at the same conference. He also won the MyFaceMyBody Award (London 2016) and the Irish Healthcare Award (Dublin 2017) for further medical research related to the use of hyalase in dermal filler vascular occlusion and establishing re-epithelialisation of skin by use of hyperbaric oxygen, platelet growth factors and phototherapy accelerating wound healing. He won the 'Quality & Research Award' British College of Aesthetic Medicine (London) in September 2017. The first ever Abu Dhabi International Conference in Dermatology & Aesthetics (AIDA 2017) AIDA Award was presented to Treacy in October 2017 for his contributions to wound healing and for the "HELPIR Technique: Treating Vascular Complications of Dermal Fillers". He was made also the first laureate of the 2017 'Art of Beauty Trophy' by the members of AAAMC Organizing Committee in Baku, Azerbaijan for his contributions to the development of the field of aesthetic medicine, especially writing the protocols for the use of hyalase. He was also awarded a specialist Azerbaijani Laureate Diploma in Aesthetic Medicine in 2017. Ailesbury Dublin won the John Bannon Award "Best Clinic in Ireland" 2017 at the Aesthetic Awards in London. Treacy was given another specialist MyFaceMyBody award in 2018 for his scientific research contribution to the aesthetic industry. Dr Treacy was awarded the 2022 AIDA Award in Abu Dhabi for Outstanding Contributions to Aesthetic Medicine. The award acknowledged his work in establishing globally recognised protocols for the use of hyaluronidase during vascular occlusion. Hyaluronidase is now used by plastic surgeons and dermatologists worldwide to reverse the injurious effects of hyaluronic acid injections, and Dr Treacy is recognised to be among the first doctors worldwide to use this compound and establish protocols for its use. In 2023, he was awarded the Tia Maria Lifetime Achievement Award for his "outstanding  vision, dedication, and commitment to research, philanthropy and improving standards in Aesthetic Medicine through education and research".

International medical awards 2022–2018 

  Winner – Tia Maria Lifetime Achievement Award (Cork) 2023 
  Winner – AIDA Trophy 'Outstanding Contributions to Aesthetic Medicine (Abu Dhabi) May 2022
  Winner – MyFaceMyBody 'Top Global Medical Practitioner' 2019 (Las Vegas) November 2019
  Winner – MyFaceMyBody 'Top UK & Ire Medical Practitioner' 2019 (Las Vegas) November 2019
  Winner – AMEC Anti-aging & Beauty Trophy ‘Best Global Clinical Case’ (Monaco), October 2019
  Winner – Irish Healthcare Award ‘Best Medical Aesthetic Clinic (Dublin), Sept 2019
  Winner – MyFaceMyBody Specialist Award 'Scientific Contributions to the Aesthetic Industry' (London), March 2018

International medical awards 2017–2015 

  Winner – Irish Healthcare Award ‘Best Medical Research Award’ (Dublin), March 2017
  Winner – MyFaceMyBody Award 'Ultimate 100 Global Aesthetic Leaders' (Los Angeles), August 2017
  Second – AMEC Anti-aging & Beauty Trophy ‘Best Global Clinical Case in Laser Medicine’ (Monaco), September 2017
  Second – AMEC Anti-aging & Beauty Trophy ‘Best Global Clinical Case in Thread lifting’ (Monaco), September 2017
  Winner –  British College of Aesthetic Medicine 'Quality & Research Award'(London) September 2017
  Winner – AIDA Trophy 'Best Clinical Case in Aesthetic Medicine in Dermatology & Aesthetics' (Abu Dhabi) Oct 2017
  Winner – AAAMC Trophy 'Contribution to Development of Aesthetic Medicine’ Azerbaijan Nat. Organizing Committee (Baku) Oct 2017
  Winner – John Bannon Award for the "Best Clinic in Ireland" at the Aesthetic Awards (London), December 2017
  Winner – Irish Health & Beauty Award 'Best Cosmetic Surgery Clinic in Ireland 2016' (Dublin), June 2016
  Winner – Safety in Beauty Award Aesthetic Doctor of 2016’ (Highly Commended) (London), June 2016
  Winner – AMEC Anti-aging & Beauty Trophy ‘Best Clinical Research Case in Aesthetic Medicine’ (Paris), September 2016
  Winner – CCME Mexican Congress Medal for' Excellence in Medical Aesthetics' (Mexico), November 2016
  Winner – MyFaceMyBody Award ‘Best medical research for wound healing' (London), November 2016

Published works 
Treacy has published many scientific papers, including sentinel papers about the rising incidence of cutaneous malignant melanoma in the Rochester, Minnesota population from 1950 to 1985 and protocols for the reversal of dermal filler complications.

 Treacy Patrick J.; Popescu NA; Kurland LT; Cutaneous malignant melanoma in Rochester, Minnesota: trends in incidence and survivorship, 1950 through 1985, Mayo Clin Proc. 1990 Oct, 65(10):1293-302.
 Treacy Patrick J.; Goldberg D; Use of a BioPolymer Filler for Facial Lipodystrophy in HIV-Positive patients undergoing treatment with Anti Retro Viral Drugs, Journal of Dermatologic Surgery, Volume 32, Number 6, June 2006, pp. 804–808(5)  
 Treacy Patrick J.; Goldberg D.; Use of Phosphatidylcholine for the correction of lower lid bulging due to prominent fat pads, Journal of Cosm Laser Therapy, 2 September 2006
 Treacy Patrick J.; Combining Therapies for the Aging Face – The Dublin Lift, Prime International Magazine, Vol 2 No 7 Page 20–31  1 October 2012
 Treacy Patrick J.; The paradoxical effect of Botox on the brain, Prime International Magazine, June 2013 Page 63-69  1 May 2013
 Treacy Patrick J.; The efficacy of dermal fillers in the treatment of atrophic acne scars, Prime International Magazine, Vol 3 No 2 Page 40–49, 1 March 2013
 Treacy Patrick J.; Treacy Comparative split-face study on photoaging with two different  fractionalised resurfacing lasers, PRIME International Magazine, 14 October 2013
 Treacy Patrick J.; Reversal of a dermal filler induced facial artery occlusion, PRIME International Magazine, 1 September 2014
 Treacy Patrick J.; Surgical correction of semi-permanent lip filler nodules, PRIME International Magazine, 1 October 2014
 Treacy Patrick J.; Treating facial cancer-related cachexia by aesthetic medicine, PRIME International Magazine, 2 January 2015
 Treacy Patrick J.; Non-Surgical Rejuvenation of the Periorbital Area, PRIME Magazine International, 3 May 2016
 Treacy Patrick J.; Reversal of a nine-day-old vascular occlusion by using the HELPIR technique, PRIME International Magazine, November 2016
 Treacy Patrick J.; The use of methotrexate to treat non-reversible Covid-19 vaccine nodules, PRIME International Magazine, November 2022

Bibliography

Non-fiction
 Behind The Mask Liberties Press (2015) 
 Needle and The Damage Done Austin Macauley Publishers (2021) 
 The Evolution of Aesthetic Medicine Austin Macauley Publishers (2022) 
 Prevention and Management of Aesthetic Complications Minerva Press Italy (2022) 
 Aesthetic Complications and Other Interesting Cases Austin Macauley Publishers (2023)

References

Living people
Irish general practitioners
Medical doctors from Dublin (city)
Year of birth missing (living people)
Irish plastic surgeons